North Pacific was an early steamboat operating in Puget Sound, on the Columbia River, and in British Columbia and Alaska.  The vessel's nickname was "the White Schooner" which was not based on the vessel's rig, but rather on speed, as "to schoon" in nautical parlance originally meant to go fast.

Design and construction
North Pacific was built in San Francisco for E.A. and L.M. Starr.  The Starrs were pioneer businessmen in Portland.  The Starrs had been unsuccessfully trying to compete with Finch and Wright, first with the sidewheeler Alida and then with the small steamer Isabel.  The Starrs brought North Pacific to Puget Sound in 1871 to compete with the firm of D.B. Finch and Capt. Tom Wright (1828–1906).  Finch and Wright had run the pioneer sidewheeler Eliza Anderson on the Sound, and had recently replaced the Anderson with the faster sidewheeler Olympia (later known as the Princess Louise).

North Pacific was 488.73 gross tons in size, with "tons" in this instance being a measure of volume and not weight. The official merchant vessel registry number was 18685.

North Pacific was driven by a single-cylinder walking beam engine,  piston,  stroke

Operation on Puget Sound
When North Pacific arrived at Puget Sound in June 1871, the vessel was considered to be the finest (and was certainly one of the largest) vessels yet to operate in the area.  On June 27, 1871, North Pacific raced Olympia across the Strait of Juan de Fuca from Victoria, British Columbia to Port Townsend, Washington, beating Olympia by three minutes.  A lot of money was wagered on the outcome, and the bets were paid off at Port Townsend.  Newell described the scene:

The steamers continued racing however all the way to Olympia, Washington and the Olympia was able to edge out the North Pacific over this longer run.  Even so, with the North Pacific the Starrs were finally able to best Finch and Wright, who accepted $7,500 from the Starrs to withdraw Olympia from the Puget Sound service, and take her south to California.

Columbia River service
The Starrs left the steam navigation business in the on set of 1881 and sold North Pacific to the Oregon Railway and Navigation Company (known as the OR&N), which operated the vessel for a year on the Columbia River under Capt. O.A. Anderson (1842–1912).

Return to Puget Sound

Afterwards, the O.R. & N returned North Pacific to Puget Sound, running the vessel on various routes and as a relief boat.  In 1885, North Pacific made alternate runs with the large iron sidewheeler Olympian on the route from Puget Sound to Victoria.  Later, apparently after suffering a broken walking-beam and blown out cylinder head, North Pacific was demoted to relief boat service on the Vancouver, British Columbia run for Olympian and Alaskan, another large sidewheeler which was near-sistership of Olympian.

1898 Alaska Gold Rush
During the 1898 Alaska Gold Rush, North Pacific  made runs every 15 days from Seattle to Skagway and Dyea, Alaska, embarking 150 first class and 150 second class passengers and carrying 70 tons of freight on each trip.  North Pacifics last Alaska trip began on April 28, 1898.  On return was kept at Port Townsend, Washington before resuming service on Puget Sound.  In 1899, Cary W. Cook bought North Pacific to replace Ocean Wave on the routes he was running from Puget Sound into British Columbia.  In 1900, Cook formed the Western Steam Navigation Company at Tacoma, Washington to conduct the operations of North Pacific.

Loss

On July 18, 1903, running off Marrowstone Point in a fog, North Pacific went off course and struck a rock.  The tug C.B. Smith heard the distress call of the old steamer (traditionally five blasts from the steam whistle) and was able to rescue all her passengers and crew.  Later North Pacific drifted off the rock, sank in deep water (15 fathoms) and could not be raised.  Coincidentally the running mate of the  North Pacific, the steamboat Mainlander, was headed the opposite direction on the same route.  Mainlander also grounded about an hour later near the place, but suffered only minor damage.

Notes

Further reading

 Carey, Roland, The Sound of Steamers, Alderbrook Publishing, Seattle, WA 1965
 Gibbs, Jim, and Williamson, Joe, Maritime Memories of Puget Sound, Schiffer Publishing, West Chester PA 1987 
 Newell, Gordon R.,  and Williamson, Joe, Pacific Steamboats, Superior Publishing, Seattle WA 1958

Steamboats of Washington (state)
Sidewheel steamboats of Washington (state)
Steamboats of Oregon
Steamboats of the Columbia River
Ships built in San Francisco
1871 ships
Passenger ships of the United States
Merchant ships of the United States
Maritime incidents in 1903
Shipwrecks of the Washington coast